Edward Chalupka (February 23, 1947 – November 17, 2019) was a Canadian Football League (CFL) player.  He played college football at the University of North Carolina. Calupka played his entire professional career as a guard for the Hamilton Tiger-Cats, from  through . He won the Grey Cup with Hamilton in 1972.

In 1981, five years after retiring from the CFL, Chalupka was elected as the fifth president of the Canadian Football League Players' Association (CFLPA).  He served as CFLPA president until 1986, and was succeeded and preceded in that role by Saskatchewan Roughriders running back George Reed. He died on November 17, 2019 at the age of 72.

References

1947 births
2019 deaths
Canadian football offensive linemen
Canadian players of American football
Hamilton Tiger-Cats players
North Carolina Tar Heels football players
Players of Canadian football from Ontario
Sportspeople from Peterborough, Ontario